Marian McKnight (born December 19, 1936) is an American actress, model and former  beauty pageant winner. She was crowned Miss America in 1957.

Pageantry
She earned the 1957 Miss America title with a Marilyn Monroe act in the talent portion.  She later worked with Monroe's ex-husband, Joe DiMaggio, for a Virginia supplier of military bases.  Despite the contention of Monroe biographer Donald Spoto, McKnight denied that she and DiMaggio were romantically involved.

Career
In 1967, McKnight played Jack's mother in Hanna-Barbera's live action version of Jack and the Beanstalk, an Emmy Award-winning film directed by Gene Kelly, in which he also appeared as Jeremy the Peddler.

She appeared in an episode of The Love Boat in 1984, along with Jean Bartel, Miss America 1943; Nancy Fleming, Miss America 1961; and Vanessa L. Williams, Miss America 1984.

Personal life
McKnight married actor Gary Conway in 1958 after meeting at UCLA. They have two children (Gareth and Kathleen).

McKnight and Conway are the owners of Carmody McKnight winery.

References

External links
 Miss America profile of Marian McKnight
 Carmondy McKnight Winery

Miss America winners
1936 births
Living people
University of California, Los Angeles alumni
People from Manning, South Carolina